High Street is the main historical street and the original main thoroughfare in the centre of Newport, South Wales. Nowadays it runs approximately 280m between Westgate Square and the Old Green Interchange (facing Newport Castle).

Description

Newport's High Street leads away southwest from Newport Castle and Newport Bridge through the city centre, bending to head south approximately four-fifths of the way along its route. Landmarks along the street include the Kings Head Hotel building, the facade of the Old Post Office (now disguising a multi-storey carpark), the Olde Murenger's Pub, Newport Market and Newport Arcade. Since the early 2010s the street has undergone re-paving and other improvements.

History
Newport, in 1810, was described as "consisting principally of one street, built partly on the banks of the Usk" and this description is corroborated by the 1750 map of Newport.  High Street led to what is now Stow Hill and eventually to the town church, St Woolos. The town once had town walls with three gates, the middle one was in the centre of the High Street and was finally demolished in 1808. The High Street was widened in 1809 and, in 1810, the development of Commercial Street began, spreading the town west.

A tax collector lived on the High Street to collect money to pay for repairs to the walls though the Murenger's House (a 'murenger' was a tax collector) was demolished in 1816. A pub, Ye Olde Murenger House, still exists on High Street, claiming to be Newport's oldest pub operating since 1530 (it was elaborated with faux jetties at some point during the 20th-century). A Post Office was built on High Street in 1844, rebuilt in 1907 and reconstructed in 2001 (according to the blue plaque on the building).

A market took place in a block on the east side of the High Street from 1817. It was expanded in 1865 and, in May 1889 an even larger indoor market was opened, with a 58m central hall. The High Street facade of the building dates from the early 1900s, in Portland stone. Two covered shopping arcades run off High Street, both probably by local architects Habershon & Fawckner and both now Grade II listed. Newport Arcade to the west dates from 1893 and Market Arcade, to the east, dates from circa 1900.

The High Street became a one-way system for motorised vehicles in 1949.

21st century
In the 2010s the High Street underwent regeneration and pedestrianisation as part of a wider £2.6 million project to improve the city centre shopping experience.

References

Shopping streets in Wales
Streets and squares in Newport, Wales
Shopping in Newport, Wales